This article shows a very limited and not all-encompassing list of entertainment events that were held at Kia Forum in Inglewood, California, United States. The busiest music arena in the Los Angeles area has hosted many local, regional, and international artists since its opening in late 1967. An incomplete list of entertainment events is given in the tables below in chronological order.

It is hoped that others will help fill in the blanks to make for a more comprehensive history. Many historical productions have been performed here. Hopefully, they can further be substantiated for inclusion in "The List".

The Rolling Stones set a record-breaking gross in 1969 from two shows with a total gross of $238,000 which was later surpassed by Elvis Presley in late-1970 with a total gross of $313,000, and later Kanye West during his 2016 Saint Pablo Tour, with a total gross of $8,292,767 across 6 shows.

1968 - present

Notes

References 

Entertainment events at Forum, The
Entertainment events in the United States
Events in Los Angeles
Lists of events by venue
Lists of events in the United States
Entertainment events at Forum, The